Heavy Trash is an American rockabilly band based in New York City, formed by Jon Spencer of The Jon Spencer Blues Explosion and Matt Verta-Ray (formerly of New York bands Madder Rose and Speedball Baby). The band's music draws from an eclectic mix of genres, including rock & roll, rockabilly, blues, alternative country, and garage rock or garage punk. They are currently signed to Yep Roc Records, Bronzerat Records and Crunchy Frog Records.
They once toured together with the Canadian band The Sadies, under the name of Heavy Trash and The Sadies.

Discography
Heavy Trash – 2005
Going Way Out with Heavy Trash – 2007
Midnight Soul Serenade – 2009

References

External links
Heavy Trash  official website

Musical groups established in 2005
Rockabilly music groups
Rock music groups from New York (state)
Yep Roc Records artists